Michał Piotr Boym (c. 1612 – 1659) was a Polish Jesuit missionary to China, scientist and explorer.  He was an early Western traveller within the Chinese mainland, and the author of numerous works on Asian fauna, flora and geography.  The first European Chinese dictionary, published in 1670, is attributed to Boym.

Biography 

Michał Boym was born in Lwów, Poland (now Lviv, Ukraine), around 1614, to a well-off family of Hungarian ancestry. His grandfather  Jerzy Boim came to Poland from Hungary with the king  Stefan Batory, and married Jadwiga Niżniowska. Michał's father,  Paweł Jerzy Boim (1581–1641), was a physician to King Sigismund III of Poland. Out of Pawel Jerzy's six sons, the eldest, the ne'er-do-well Jerzy was disinherited; Mikołaj and Jan became merchants;  Paweł, a doctor; while
Michał and  Benedykt Paweł joined the Society of Jesus. The family had their own family chapel in Lviv's central square, which was constructed around the time of Michał's birth.

In 1631, Boym joined the Jesuits in Kraków, and was ordained a priest. In 1643, after almost a decade of intensive studies in the monasteries of Kraków, Kalisz, Jarosław and Sandomierz, Boym embarked on a voyage to Eastern Asia. He first traveled to Rome, where he obtained a blessing for his mission from Pope Urban VIII, and then proceeded to Lisbon. Later that year he embarked with a group of nine other priests and clerics on a voyage to Portuguese Goa, and then Macau. Initially he taught at St. Paul Jesuit College (Macau). He then moved to the island of Hainan, where he opened a small Catholic mission. After the island had been conquered by the Manchus, Boym had to flee to Tonkin in 1647.

Even as Jesuits in northern and central China were successfully switching their loyalties from the fallen Ming Dynasty to the newly established Qing, the  Jesuits in the south of the country continued to work with the Ming loyalist regimes still controlling some of the region. Accordingly, in 1649 Boym was sent  by the Canton-based Vice-Provincial of the China Mission Alvaro Semedo with a diplomatic mission to the court of the Yongli Emperor, the last Chinese ruler of the Ming Dynasty, still controlling parts of Southwestern China.

As the Yongli regime was endangered by the encroaching Manchus, the Jesuit Andreas Wolfgang Koffler, who had been at the Yongli court since 1645, had succeeded in converting many of the members of the imperial family to  Christianity believing this would attract help from Western monarchs for the Southern Ming's struggle to continue to rule China. Among the Christians at the Yongli's court were Empress dowager Helena Wang (Wang Liena), the main wife of the emperor's father; Empress dowager Maria Ma (Ma Maliya), the mother of the emperor; Empress Anne Wang, the main wife of the emperor; and the heir to the throne, prince Constantine (Dangding), Zhu Cuxuan. The Emperor's eunuch secretary Pang Tianshou (龐天壽), known by his Christian name  Achilles, had become a Christian as well, years earlier.

Boym was chosen to present the situation of the Chinese Emperor to the Pope. He received letters from Empress dowager Helena and from Pang Achilles, to give to Pope Innocent X, the General of the Jesuit Order, and Cardinal John de Lugo. Additional letters were dispatched to the Doge of Venice and to the King of Portugal. Together with a young court official named  Andrew Zheng, Boym embarked on his return voyage to Europe. They arrived at Goa in May 1651, where they learned that the King of Portugal had already abandoned the cause of the Chinese (Southern Ming) Emperor, and that Boym's mission was seen as a possible threat to future relations with the victorious Manchu. This view was also supported by the new local superior of the Jesuits, who believed the Jesuit Order should not interfere in the internal power struggles of China.

Boym was placed under house arrest. However, he managed to escape and continue his voyage  on foot. By way of Hyderabad, Surat, Bander Abbas and Shiraz, he arrived at Isfahan, in Persia. From there he continued his journey to Erzerum, Trabzon and İzmir, where he arrived near the end of August 1652. As the Venetian court was having conflicts with the Jesuits, Boym discarded his habit and dressed up as a Chinese Mandarin, before he arrived in Venice in December of that year. Although he had managed to cross uncharted waters and unknown lands, his mission there would not be easy, as the political intrigues at the European courts proved to be extremely complicated.

Initially the Doge of Venice refused to grant Boym an audience, as Venice wanted to maintain a neutral stance in regards to China. Boym managed to convince the French ambassador to support his cause, and the Doge finally saw Boym and accepted the letter. However, the French involvement caused a negative reaction from the Pope, as Innocent X was actively opposed to France and its ambitions. Also the newly elected General of the Jesuits, Gosvinus Nickel, believed Boym's mission might endanger other Jesuit missions in China and other parts of the world. A new Pope was elected in 1655, and after three years, Alexander VII finally saw Boym on 18 December 1655. However, although Alexander was sympathetic to the Ming dynasty and its dilemma, he could not offer any practical help and his letter to the Chinese emperor contained little but words of empathy and offers of prayers. However, the letter from the new Pope opened many doors for Boym and his mission. In Lisbon, he was granted an audience by King John IV, who promised to help the Chinese struggle with military force.

In March 1656, Boym started his return trip to China. Out of eight priests accompanying him, only four survived the journey. Upon reaching Goa it turned out that Yongli's situation was dire and that the local Portuguese administration, despite direct orders from the monarch, did not want to let Boym travel to Macau. This was in order not to compromise their commercial enterprises with the victorious Manchu. Boym again ignored the Portuguese monopoly by travelling on foot, this time by an uncharted route to Ayutthaya, the capital of Siam. He arrived there in early 1658, and hired a ship from pirates, with which he sailed to northern Vietnam. In Hanoi, Boym tried to procure a guide to lead him and the priests travelling with him to Yunnan. However, he was unsuccessful and he had to continue the journey alone, with the assistance only of Chang, who had travelled with him all the way to Europe and back. They reached the Chinese province of Guangxi, but on 22 June 1659 Boym died, having failed to reach the emperor's court. The burial place remains unknown.

Works 

Boym is best remembered for his works describing the flora, fauna, history, traditions and customs of the countries he travelled through. During his first trip to China he wrote a short work on the plants and animals dwelling in Mozambique. The work was later sent to Rome, but was never printed. During his return trip he prepared a large collection of maps of mainland China and South-East Asia. He planned to expand it to nine chapters describing China, its customs and political system, as well as Chinese science and inventions. The merit of Boym's maps was that they were the first European maps to properly represent Korea as a peninsula rather than an island. They also took notice of the correct positions of many Chinese cities previously unknown to the westerners or known only by the semi-fabulous descriptions of Marco Polo. Boym also marked the Great Wall and the Gobi Desert. Although the collection was not published during Boym's lifetime, it extended the knowledge of China in the west.

The best known of Boym's works is the Flora Sinensis ("Chinese Flora"), published in Vienna in 1656. The book was the first description of an ecosystem of the Far East published in Europe. Boym underlined the medicinal properties of the Chinese plants. The book also included pleas for support of the Catholic Chinese emperor and a poem containing nearly a hundred chronograms pointing to the date of 1655, the date of coronation of Emperor Leopold I as the King of Hungary, as Boym wanted to gain support of that monarch for his mission.

Athanasius Kircher heavily drew on the Flora Sinensis for the chapters on the plants and animals of China in his celebrated China Illustrata (1667).  Boym authored the first published Chinese dictionary for a European language, a Chinese–French dictionary published in the first French edition of Kircher's work, in 1670.

In his other works, such as Specimen medicinae Sinicae ("Chinese medicinal plants") and Clavis medica ad Chinarum doctrinam de pulsibus ("Key to the Medical Doctrine of the Chinese on the Pulse") he described the Chinese traditional medicine and introduced several methods of healing and diagnostics previously unknown in Europe, particularly measurement of the pulse.
The latter book was likely written by the Dutch doctor and scholar Willem ten Rhijne.

See also 

Benedict of Poland
Jan Mikołaj Smogulecki
List of Jesuit scientists
List of Roman Catholic cleric-scientists
Nicolae Milescu

Notes and references

External links 

 Flora Sinensis 1656 at Bibliothèque Universitaire Moretus Plantin.
 Hartmut Walravens, "Michael Boym und die Flora Sinensis" - very good bio, and analysis of Flora Sinensis 
 https://web.archive.org/web/20070727002548/http://form.nlc.gov.cn/sino/show.php?id=2 (Chinese)

1610s births
1659 deaths
17th century in China
Jesuit missionaries in China
Polish explorers
Clergy from Lviv
17th-century Polish Jesuits
Polish people of Hungarian descent
Polish Roman Catholic missionaries
Polish sinologists
Roman Catholic missionaries in China
Jesuit scientists
Jesuit missionaries
Polish expatriates in China
Missionary linguists
17th-century Latin-language writers